Bankwell  is a surname. Notable people with the surname include:

John de Bankwell (died 1308), English judge
Roger de Bankwell ( 1340), English commissioner and judge

See also
Banwell (surname)